Jorge Duvane (born 9 September 1982) is a Mozambican middle-distance runner. He competed in the men's 800 metres at the 2000 Summer Olympics.

References

External links
 

1982 births
Living people
Athletes (track and field) at the 2000 Summer Olympics
Mozambican male middle-distance runners
Olympic athletes of Mozambique
Place of birth missing (living people)